Tracadie is a small community in the Canadian province of Nova Scotia, located in Antigonish County. Tracadie has close links with nearby Upper Big Tracadie.  Led by Thomas Brownspriggs, Tracadie was settled by Black Loyalists in the early 18th century.  According to one 19th century observer, this community was the most successful rural Black community in the province.

The Order of Saint Augustine established the first of their Canadian houses at Tracadie, in 1938.

See also 
Black Nova Scotians

References

Tracadie on Destination Nova Scotia

 Black Loyalist history in Tracadie

Communities in Antigonish County, Nova Scotia
General Service Areas in Nova Scotia
Black Canadian settlements